

N

References